Jacopo Baccarini (c. 1605–1682) was an Italian painter of the Baroque period born in Reggio, where he lived and painted. He trained with Orazio Talami (1624–1708). He painted Repose during flight to Egypt and Death of St Alessio for the church of San Filippo in Reggio. He is also known as Jacopo da Reggio or Giacomo Baccarini.

References

1600s births
1682 deaths
People from Reggio Emilia
17th-century Italian painters
Italian male painters
Italian Baroque painters